Chiguirí Arriba is a corregimiento in Penonomé District, Coclé Province, Panama with a population of 10,018 as of 2010. Its population as of 1990 was 7,459; its population as of 2000 was 8,581.

References

Corregimientos of Coclé Province